The Swami's Ring is the 61st volume in the Nancy Drew Mystery Stories series. It was first published in 1981 under the pseudonym Carolyn Keene. It was written by Nancy Axelrad.

The novel was the basis of the play Nancy Drew and the Swami's Ring by Laura Shamas, published in 1982.

Plot summary
When Nancy Drew discovers an amnesia victim is carrying a royal Hindu ring, she is all the more determined to use her detective talent to identify him. At the same time, she is working on a mystery for a beautiful harpist.

References

Nancy Drew books
1981 American novels
1981 children's books
Simon & Schuster books
Children's mystery novels